Sarah Shun-lien Bynum (born February 14, 1972) is a Chinese American writer. She previously taught writing and literature in the Graduate MFA Writing program at Otis College of Art and Design until 2015. Bynum is a graduate of Brown University and the University of Iowa Writers' Workshop. She lives in Los Angeles with her husband and daughter. Her brother is musician Taylor Ho Bynum.

Fairy tales are a common theme in many of her works. Bynum describes fairy tales by saying, "they always walk that line between wonder and darkness."  Madeleine is Sleeping was published by Harcourt in 2004, was a finalist for the National Book Award, and winner of the Janet Heidinger Kafka Prize. Her short stories, including excerpts from her new novel, have appeared in The New Yorker, Tin House, Triquarterly, The Georgia Review, Alaska Quarterly Review, and in Best American Short Stories. Her second novel, Ms. Hempel Chronicles, was published in September 2008 and was a finalist for the PEN/Faulkner Award in 2009.

In a 2009 book review of Ms. Hempel Chronicles published in the Sunday book review of The New York Times, Josh Emmons notes Bynum's "prose remains nimble and entertaining, a model of quiet control well suited to its subject" and the "deftness with which [Ms. Hempel] observes and describes her world and its inhabitants is so engaging that for all its circumspection and regrettable lacunae, “Ms. Hempel Chronicles” works as an account of how nostalgia — both for what was and might have been — can generate a thousand mercies."

In 2010, Bynum was named one of New Yorker magazine's top "20 Under 40" fiction writers in which the editors note her works "offer idiosyncratic, voice-driven narratives."

In 2017, she was featured in an interview in The New Yorker magazine on surviving adolescence and social media.

Awards
 2004 Janet Heidinger Kafka Prize for Madeleine is Sleeping
 2005 Whiting Award for Fiction
 2020 Finalist for The Story Prize

Works

Books

Anthologies

Short stories
 "Accomplice." The Georgia Review. Spring 2003.
 "Creep." TriQuarterly. Spring 2005.

"These Are Mysteries." Gulf Coast. Winter/Spring 2011.
"Christmas, 1990." The Cincinnati Review. Winter 2011.

"Likes". The New Yorker. 9 October 2017.

Essays 
 on Angela Carter's The Bloody Chamber for Amazon: Writers Under the Influence. Fall 2004.
 on Edmund White's A Boy's Own Story for A New Literary History of America. September 2009.
 on Philip Roth's Goodbye, Columbus for Ninth Letter. Spring/Summer 2010.

Book Reviews 
 Review of Gautam Malkani's novel Londonstani. The Washington Post. June 2006.

Readings 
 Reading of "Extra" by Yiyun Li with Deborah Treisman for The New Yorker, 2017.

References

External links
Profile at The Whiting Foundation
Sarah Shun-lien Bynum's personal website.

American women short story writers
Living people
Iowa Writers' Workshop alumni
Place of birth missing (living people)
1972 births
21st-century American short story writers
Brown University alumni
Otis College of Art and Design faculty
American women novelists
21st-century American novelists
21st-century American women writers
PEN/Faulkner Award for Fiction winners
American women academics